The  Mémorial Olivier Barras is a professional golf tournament that is held annually at Crans-sur-Sierre Golf Club in Crans-Montana, Valais, Switzerland. It was founded in 1965 in memory of Olivier Barras, a nine-time Swiss champion golfer who died in a car crash in June 1964, at Monza racing on the track.

History
The tournament featured on the Challenge Tour between 1990 and 2000, usually as an unofficial money event, and later on the Alps Tour.
Founded in 1965, the 2020 tournament was the 56th installment.

The tournament is named in honor of nine-time Swiss golfer Olivier Barras (1932–1964), son of Crans-sur-Sierre GC president Antoine Barras, who died in a Monza car crash.

For several years, the best amateur and the best professional have earned qualification for the Omega European Masters (formerly the Swiss Open), held at the same course since 1939.

Winners

Notes

References

External links
Coverage on the Challenge Tour's official site

Former Challenge Tour events
Golf tournaments in Switzerland
Recurring events established in 1965
1965 establishments in Switzerland